René Le Corre (12 March 1923 – 5 May 2021) was a French poet.

A professor of philosophy, he published numerous poems.

Works
Bretagne, le clos et l'ouvert (1982)
Pourquoi la mer ? (1984)
Couleur du temps (1985)
Livre de chevet des hommes et des femmes du xxie siècle (1995)
L’Ombre bleue (1996)
L'Inespéré (2007)
Les saisons (2011)
Un monde de rosée (2017)

References

1923 births
2021 deaths
French poets
People from Finistère